The 1841 Michigan gubernatorial election was held from November 1, 1841 to November 2, 1841. Democrat nominee John S. Barry defeated Whig nominee Philo C. Fuller with 55.74% of the vote.

General election

Candidates
Major party candidates
John S. Barry, Democratic
Philo C. Fuller, Whig
Other candidates
Jabez S. Fitch, Liberty

Results

References

1841
Michigan
Gubernatorial
November 1841 events